Salvatore Corallo (11 October 1928 – 4 May 2019) was an Italian politician of the Communist Party (PCI). Born in Syracuse, Sicily, he was elected to the Sicilian Regional Assembly in 1959. Corallo was appointed President of Sicily in June 1961, serving in this role for a period of less than three months. He later served as a member of the Chamber of Deputies in Legislature VII (1976–1979), and as a Senator in Legislature VIII (1979–1983).

Corallo died on 4 May 2019 in Syracuse, at the age of 90.

References

External links

 Salvatore Corallo – Chamber of Deputies profile 

1928 births
2019 deaths
Deputies of Legislature VII of Italy
Italian Communist Party politicians
Members of the Sicilian Regional Assembly
People from Syracuse, Sicily
Senators of Legislature VIII of Italy